Thomas Christopher Humphrey is an American politician from the state of North Carolina. A member of the Republican Party, he represents the 12th district in the North Carolina House of Representatives.

Humphrey served as a county commissioner for Lenoir County, North Carolina. In the 2018 elections, Humphrey ran for the North Carolina House in District 12. He won the election, defeating George Graham, and was sworn into office on January 3, 2019.

Electoral history

2020

2018

Committee assignments

2021-2022 session
Insurance (Chair)
Appropriations 
Appropriations - Agriculture and Natural and Economic Resources 
Agriculture
Energy and Public Utilities 
Health

2019-2020 session
Insurance 
Appropriations 
Appropriations - Agriculture and Natural and Economic Resources
Agriculture 
Energy and Public Utilities 
Health 
Finance 
Judiciary

References

External links

Living people
People from Lenoir County, North Carolina
County commissioners in North Carolina
Republican Party members of the North Carolina House of Representatives
Place of birth missing (living people)
Year of birth missing (living people)